DeMordaunt is a surname. Notable people with the surname include:

 Reed DeMordaunt, American politician
 Gayann DeMordaunt, American politician
 Walter DeMordaunt, American architect

See also
 Mordaunt

Surnames of French origin
French-language surnames